John N. Heiskell (1872–1972) was a U.S. Senator from Arkansas in 1913. Senator Heiskell may also refer to:

Frederick Heiskell (1786–1882), Tennessee State Senate
Joseph Brown Heiskell (1823–1913), Tennessee State Senate

See also
Senator Haskell (disambiguation)